It's a Laugh Productions, Inc. is an American production company owned by The Walt Disney Company which produces live-action teen sitcoms and sketch comedies airing on Disney Channel and Disney XD. It is a division of Disney Branded Television.

Most shows are produced and filmed  at Hollywood Center Studios, though Good Luck Charlie and Austin & Ally were filmed at Sunset Bronson Studios; the pilot episode of Hannah Montana was filmed at Hollywood Center before moving to Sunset Bronson for the rest of the series; Sonny with a Chance and Austin & Ally filmed at The Burbank Studios before a move to Hollywood Center in their second respective seasons. Pair of Kings was recorded at Sunset Gower Studios before moving to Hollywood Center for its third and final season. Shake It Up was filmed at LA Center Studios (as well as the second and third seasons of Good Luck Charlie). Jonas is the only production as of 2019 to record in a single-camera setup with film cameras rather than the normal multicam using video cameras. It was also filmed on location with closed sets.

History

It's a Laugh Productions, Inc. was founded on November 3, 2003, and founded by Don Mink and Amy Rabins.

Series

Films

Theatrical films

Television films

Crossovers

Notes:
 Both "That's So Suite Life of Hannah Montana" and "Wizards on Deck with Hannah Montana" are counted as three separate episodes (the former being the That's So Raven episode "Checkin' Out", The Suite Life of Zack & Cody episode, "That's So Suite Life of Hannah Montana", and the Hannah Montana episode "On the Road Again", while the latter being the Wizards of Waverly Place episode "Cast-Away (To Another Show)", The Suite Life on Deck episode "Double-Crossed", and the Hannah Montana episode "Super(stitious) Girl").
 "Take This Job and Love It" is officially counted as a Hannah Montana episode.
 "Weasels on Deck" is counted as an I'm in the Band episode.
 "Charlie Shakes It Up" is counted as a Good Luck Charlie episode.
 "Austin & Jessie & Ally All Star New Year," "Lab Rats vs. Mighty Med," "Raven About Bunk'd," and "Good Luck Jessie: NYC Christmas" are counted as an episode for both series, due to them being a separate event.
 Part 1 of "Austin & Jessie & Ally All Star New Year" is produced as an Austin & Ally episode while part 2 was produced as a Jessie episode.
 Part 1 of "Lab Rats vs. Mighty Med" was produced as a Lab Rats episode while part 2 was produced as a Mighty Med episode. 
 Part 1 of "Good Luck Jessie: NYC Christmas" was produced as a Good Luck Charlie episode while part 2 was produced as a Jessie episode.
 "Jessie's Aloha Holidays with Parker and Joey" is officially counted as a Jessie one-hour episode with Liv and Maddie characters.
 Part 1 of "Raven About Bunk'd" was produced as a Raven's Home episode while part 2 was produced as a Bunk'd episode.
 A crossover between shows did not take place due to the complications of the 2007–08 WGA strike.

References

Entertainment companies established in 2003
Disney Media Networks
Disney Channel
Disney production studios
Television production companies of the United States
Companies based in Los Angeles
Companies based in Los Angeles County, California
American companies established in 2003
2003 establishments in California